Shelia Marie Goss (born September 16, 1968) is an American author, freelance writer, and screenwriter.

Shelia Goss was born in Shreveport, Louisiana and grew up with both of her parents and two brothers. Her parents expressed the importance of education, so after four years at Southern University in Baton Rouge, LA Shelia received a Bachelor of Science in Engineering in 1990. She went on to work in corporate America prior to pursuing a career as a writer.

Goss is a bestselling author for Black Expressions and Essence Magazine for My Invisible Husband and Roses are Thorns, Violets are True. She has received many accolades including being listed in the book "Literary Divas: The Top 100+ Most Admired African-American Women in Literature."  In addition to writing fiction, Shelia is the managing editor and a writer for E-Spire Entertainment News. In February 2008, Goss released her fourth novel, Double Platinum.

Literary honors

 2009 EDC Creations Top Books Award - His Invisible Wife
 2009 Amazon Best seller - His Invisible Wife, The Ultimate Test, & Splitsville
 2008 BlackWebAwards.com - Best Female Author Site
 Disilgoldsoul 2007 YOUnity Guild Award - Most Outstanding Book Debut Promotions- "Paige’s Web"
 Infini's Outstanding Author 2006
 Literary Divas: The Top 100+ Most Admired African-American Women in Literature
 ESSENCE MAGAZINE Bestsellers List
 #1 Black Expressions.com Bestseller
 Honorable mention in a New York Times article & Writer's Digest article
 2004 OneSwan Productions Female Author of the Year
 Three Shades of Romance Magazine Reader's Choice Awards
 Dallas Morning News Bestseller

References

External links
 Shelia Goss website

1968 births
Living people
21st-century American novelists
American women novelists
African-American novelists
21st-century American women writers
American romantic fiction writers
Feminist filmmakers
American chick lit writers
Writers from Shreveport, Louisiana
American women screenwriters
Women romantic fiction writers
Novelists from Louisiana
Screenwriters from Louisiana
21st-century American screenwriters
African-American screenwriters
21st-century African-American women writers
21st-century African-American writers
20th-century African-American people
20th-century African-American women